Vermont Green Football Club is an American soccer team based in Burlington, Vermont that began play in USL League Two in the 2022 season. The club mission is centered on environmental justice with the goal of becoming a net zero soccer club. They are also a member of One Percent for the Planet, donating 1% of the club's annual revenues to approved environmental partners.

History 
Prior to the Green, the Burlington, Vermont area was home to USL League Two club, Vermont Voltage, which played from 1997 until 2014.

The club was officially announced as USL League Two's newest team on 12 October 2021. One of the club's co-founders is Matthew Wolff, a graphic designer known for his work on association football logos and jerseys. Wolff designed Vermont Green FC's logo, which was unveiled in February 2022.

The club played its first match on May 16, 2022, defeating Boston City FC 4–0. Norwegian Eythor Bjorgolfsson scored their first goal on a penalty late in the first half. On May 28, 2022 Vermont Green FC won in their home opener, in front of a crowd of 1,001 people. Portuguese midfielder Rodrigo Vaza scored his first goal for the club and the first home VGFC goal in history. On July 17, 2022, the Green defeated Western Mass Pioneers 1–0 in front of a capacity crowd of 2,500 to clinch a playoff spot in their first season of play.

Stadium 

The club plays their home matches at Virtue Field on the campus of the University of Vermont.

Technical Staff
  Adam Pfeifer – Head Coach & Technical Director
  Chris Taylor – Assistant Coach
  Staige Davis – Assistant Coach
  Reuben Ayarna – Player-Coach
  Kate Harney – Athletic Trainer

Year by Year

References

External links
 

Soccer clubs in Vermont
2021 establishments in Vermont
Association football clubs established in 2021
Sports in Burlington, Vermont